Lawrence Sutin (born October 12, 1951) is the author of two memoirs, two biographies, a novel and a work of history.

History of works
Sutin's debut book was Divine Invasions: A Life of Philip K. Dick. He subsequently edited two volumes of writings by Dick, In Pursuit of Valis: Selections from the Exegesis and The Shifting Realities of Philip K. Dick: Selected Literary and Philosophical Writings.

Sutin then served as editor, interviewer and author for Jack and Rochelle: A Holocaust Story of Love and Resistance, about his parents' experiences in Jewish partisan units in wartime Poland.

Sutin's second biography was Do What Thou Wilt: A Life of Aleister Crowley.

Sutin has also published A Postcard Memoir, a set of interlocking short pieces each faced by a vintage postcard image from the author's collection.

His next work was All Is Change: The Two-Thousand Year Journey of Buddhism to the West.

Most recently, Sutin has published a novel, When To Go Into the Water.

Erasure art

Sutin creates erasure books with collaged and altered texts; excerpts from these have been published online in the literary journals WaterStone and Sleet, and are also on view at his website.

In July 2021, Sutin was awarded a blue ribbon at the Island County fair in the bookmaking class for his erasure work "Lives of the Great Composers".

Professional

Sutin was a full professor in the M.F.A. and M.L.S. programs at the Hamline University Creative Writing Program in St. Paul, Minnesota. He retired from Hamline in 2015. He was also a faculty member of the Vermont College of Fine Arts. He retired from Vermont College in 2016.

Bibliography

Divine Invasions: A Life of Philip K. Dick (1989(REV.2005))
In Pursuit of Valis: Selections from the Exegesis (editor)(1991)
Jack and Rochelle: A Holocaust Story of Love and Resistance (1995)
The Shifting Realities of Philip K. Dick: Selected Literary and Philosophical Writings (editor)(1996)
Do What Thou Wilt: A Life of Aleister Crowley (2000)
A Postcard Memoir (2000)
All Is Change: The Two-Thousand Year Journey of Buddhism to the West (2006)
When To Go Into the Water (2009)

References

1951 births
Living people
Hamline University faculty
Harvard Law School alumni
University of Michigan alumni